John Donkin (1802–1854) was a British engineer. He was a son of Bryan Donkin and worked in this father's company in Bermondsey, primarily on paper-making equipment.  He married Caroline Hawes, granddaughter of William Hawes, notable as founder of the Royal Humane Society.  Caroline Hawes was the sister of Sir Benjamin Hawes, brother-in-law of Isambard Kingdom Brunel.

John Donkin was the father of Bryan Donkin Junior and grandfather of Sydney Donkin.  He was first cousin of William Fishburn Donkin.

Sources
 
  Grace's Guide Accessed 28 June 2013

Engineers from London
1802 births
1854 deaths
English mechanical engineers
People from Bermondsey